Qucha Qucha (Quechua qucha lake, the reduplication indicates that there is a complex of something, "a complex of lakes", also spelled Khocha Khocha) is a mountain in the Bolivian Andes which reaches a height of approximately . It is located in the Cochabamba Department, Carrasco Province, Pocona Municipality. Qucha Qucha lies southeast of the UNESCO World Heritage Site of Inkallaqta, north of the village of Pocona. The next peak to the northwest is Qutani (Aymara for "the one with a lake (or lakes)").

References 

Mountains of Cochabamba Department